The 2020 San Antonio FC season was the club's fifth season of existence. Including the San Antonio Thunder of the original NASL and the former San Antonio Scorpions of the modern NASL, it was the 11th season of professional soccer in San Antonio. The club played in the USL Championship, the second division of the United States soccer league system, and were scheduled to participate in the U.S. Open Cup before it was postponed and ultimately cancelled due to the COVID-19 pandemic. This was the first season without Darren Powell as head coach. Former assistant coach Alen Marcina was named head coach on December 9, 2019.

Club
Coaching staff
{|class="wikitable"
|-
!Position
!Staff

|-

|-

|-

|-

|-

|-Other information

|-

Squad information

First team squad

Player movement

In

Out

Loan in

Loan out

Pre-season 
The pre-season match vs FC Dallas was announced on December 19, 2019, by SAFC. The match vs Orlando City was announced on January 18, 2020, by OCSC. The remaining schedule was released by SAFC on January 21, 2020.

Competitions

Overall 
Position in Group D in the Western Conference

Overview 

{| class="wikitable" style="text-align: center"
|-
!rowspan=2|Competition
!colspan=8|Record
|-
!
!
!
!
!
!
!
!
|-
| USL Championship

|-
| USL Championship Playoffs

|-
! Total

USL Championship 

The season was suspended on March 12, for 30 days, due to the COVID-19 pandemic. The temporary season suspension was extended through Sunday, May 10 on March 18.

The USL Championship announced on June 24 an updated format for the remainder of the 2020 season. All 35 Championship clubs will be divided into eight groups to complete a 16-game regular season followed by a single-elimination playoff beginning July 11. Five substitutions will be allowed for the remainder of the season. Each team will have three opportunities to make substitutions during regular play. Substitutions may also be made at halftime without counting against a club's three in-game opportunities. San Antonio FC was placed in Group D along with Austin Bold FC, OKC Energy FC, Rio Grande Valley FC, and FC Tulsa.

Group table 
Group D

Results summary

Results by matchday 

Position in the Group D in the Western Conference. Week 1 position reset to align for Group play.

Matches 
The first matches of 2020 were announced on January 6, 2020. The remaining schedule was released on January 9, 2020. Home team is listed first, left to right.

Kickoff times are in CDT (UTC−05) unless shown otherwise

In the preparations for the resumption of league play following the shutdown prompted by the COVID-19 pandemic, the remainder of SAFC's schedule was announced on July 2.

USL Championship Playoffs 

On September 16, 2020, San Antonio clinched a spot in the 2020 USL Championship Playoffs.

Lamar Hunt U.S. Open Cup 

The competition was suspended on March 13, 2020, before the first round fixtures, because of the COVID-19 pandemic. The competition was officially cancelled on August 17, 2020.

Statistics

Appearances 
Discipline includes league and playoffs play.

Top scorers 
The list is sorted by shirt number when total goals are equal.

Clean sheets 
The list is sorted by shirt number when total clean sheets are equal.

Summary

Awards

Player

Staff

Notes

References 

San Antonio FC seasons
San Antonio
San Antonio FC
San Antonio FC